Komei can refer to:

Emperor Kōmei, 121st imperial ruler of Japan.
New Komeito Party, a Japanese political party.